The Kvænangsbotn Hydroelectric Power Station is a hydroelectric power station in the municipality of Kvænangen in Troms county, Norway. The Abo River is also utilized by the power plant. Water is supplied to the reservoir by the Småvatna, Lassajavre, and Cårrujavrit Hydroelectric Power Stations. The plant came into operation in 1965. In 1999 the company received a license to transfer water from the Brenn River, Šleađui River, and Olbmá River. The plant is controlled by Kvænangen Kraftverk AS, with a 48.2% share owned by Troms Kraft.

See also

References

Hydroelectric power stations in Norway
Troms
Energy infrastructure completed in 1965
Dams in Norway